Petr Štercl (born October 20, 1966 in Kroměříž) is a Czechoslovak-Czech slalom canoeist who competed in the 1990s partnering his twin brother Pavel in the C2 boat throughout his career.

Together they won four medals in the C2 team event at the ICF Canoe Slalom World Championships with two golds (1993, 1995) and two silvers (1991, 1997). They also have a gold medal from the same event from the 1998 European Championships in Roudnice nad Labem.

Štercl finished sixth in the C2 event for Czechoslovakia at the 1992 Summer Olympics in Barcelona. Four years later in Atlanta, he finished sixth in the C2 event for the Czech Republic.

World Cup individual podiums

References
 

1966 births
Canoeists at the 1992 Summer Olympics
Canoeists at the 1996 Summer Olympics
Czech male canoeists
Czechoslovak male canoeists
Living people
Olympic canoeists of Czechoslovakia
Olympic canoeists of the Czech Republic
People from Kroměříž
Czech twins
Twin sportspeople
Medalists at the ICF Canoe Slalom World Championships
Sportspeople from the Zlín Region